Ahmad Ebādi (1906 – 1993) (Persian: احمد عبادی) was an Iranian musician and setar player. Born in Tehran, he was a member of the most extraordinary family of Iranian music. Ahmad's father, Mirza Abdollah, is arguably the most influential figure in Persian traditional music, and his paternal uncle, Mirza Hossein Gholi, is also well known for his mastery in playing the tar. Ahmad's paternal grandfather, Ali Akbar Farahani, was also a talented musician.

Ahmad started learning music at an early age. At the age of seven, he was able to play tombak to accompany his father. Unfortunately he lost his father soon thereafter, but continued his education with his sisters, especially Moloud Khanom. He became one of the best setar players of all time. For years he played on Iranian radio especially in a program called Golha, produced by Davood Pirnia. Ebadi had a unique style in playing the setar. He also invented a variety of different tunings for setar.

He died in 1993 and is buried in Emamzadeh Taher Cemetery in Karaj.

Notes

References
 Haghighat, A., Honarmandān-e Irani az Āghāz tā Emrooz, Koomesh Publications, 2004 (in Persian).
 Khaleghi, R., Sargozasht-e Musighi-e Iran, Ferdowsi Publications, 1955 (in Persian).

External links
 Ahmad Ebadi entry in the Encyclopædia Iranica
 Video. Ahmad Ebadi playing setar.
 A sample of solo music on Setār by Ahmad Ebadi in the following Dastgahs: Segāh, Chahārgāh, Homāyoun, Esfahān, Afshāri.
 A sample of orchestral Persian traditional music in Segāh Dastgah, with Ahmad Ebadi playing the Setār, from the Barg-e Sabz, no. 306 . The singer is Mohammad Reza Shajarian, singing a ghazal by Saadi. Other players are Assadollah Malek, Violin, and Jahangir Malek, Tonbak. The poems, by Jami and Kamal Esmail, are read by Roshanak.

1906 births
1993 deaths
Burials at Emamzadeh Taher
Iranian setar players
Musicians from Tehran
Persian classical musicians
20th-century Iranian people